Haster is a small remote rural hamlet and district in Wick, in the Highland area of Scotland. It is located just west of the Bridge of Haster, which carries the A882 road linking the burghs of Wick and Thurso over the Achairn Burn to the main A9 road. An older village centre is about half a mile to the south.

Haster has two play parks and a football pitch, and there is a memorial fountain dedicated to General Lord Horne in the hamlet.

The ruins of St Cuthbert's Church is close to the hamlet. Thought to have measured , in 1726 it was described as the "Chapell of Haulster - the common people bury their dead about it".

References

Populated places in Caithness
Wick, Caithness